Písková Lhota is name of several locations in the Czech Republic: 
Písková Lhota (Mladá Boleslav District) 
Písková Lhota (Nymburk District)